Adventure Ocean is the brand name for Royal Caribbean International's youth activity program on board their vessels.  There are different programs tailored to fit seven age groups.  Most Adventure Ocean activities are free.  Some activities are sponsored by Fisher-Price and Crayola.  The Adventure Ocean program includes Adventure Science, a science-based lab where children can do experiments at sea.  “The Living Room,” “Fuel,” and “Optix” are the teen hangouts aboard Royal Caribbean ships.

Age groups
The program is divided up into 7 age groups: 	
Royal Babies (Ages 6-18 Months)
The program offered for the youngest kids, where parents and their babies can participate in activities involving music, toys, and learning activities.
Royal Tots (Ages 18-36 Months)
The next step up in the program, Aqua Tots is designed for toddlers to share and reinforce their early learning. Some activities include simple art and music.
Aquanauts (Ages 3-5 Years)
In the Aquanauts age group, potty-trained children, ages 3 to 5, can play games, color pictures, and become Certified Jr. Adventure Scientists.  Sample activities include Adventure Science, Bubbling Potions, Adventure Art by Crayola, Pirate Night, Camp Aquanaut Night and Sail into Story-time.
Explorers (Ages 6-8 Years)
Children ages 6 to 8 can join parties, compete for prizes, make kites and masks, and learn to make gummy candies in the Explorers program.  Children can also compete at the Wacky Olympics and Talent Show. Other activities that are offered are Wacky Water Workshop and Staggering Through the Stars.  Children can also do art projects through the Adventure Art by Crayola program.  
Voyagers (Ages 9-11 Years)
Voyagers, or children ages 9 to 11, can go in Adventure Ocean. Children can take a backstage tour, play List-o-Rama and, learn a new sport like Gagaball. Voyagers can also participate in the Adventure Science program. Other activities may include Volcanoes, Fossil Fuel Fever, The X Games, Karaoke, and the Adventure Challenge Series.
Teens 12-14 (Formerly Called Navigators) (Ages 12-14 Years)
Preteens ages 12–14 can play games and sports, join parties and contests, or spend time with other children their age in "The Living Room."  This program offers teens 12–14 years more freedom in a less-structured environment. Some activities include Scavenger Hunts, Adventure Sports, and a Video Game Challenge in the arcade.  There is also a teen-only nightclub, FUEL.
Teens 15-17 (Formerly Called Guests) (Ages 15-17 Years) 
Teens, 15–17 years of age, can hang out in “The Living Room.” They can play games and sports, join parties and contests, or dance at "FUEL", a teen-only club.

Adventure Ocean TV channel
Royal Caribbean has made a TV channel based on Adventure Ocean exclusive to the ships. The channel is aimed at mostly young children. In 2009, they also started showing family movies. It also shows, between programs, "Tot Travel Tips", a program where Kathleen Alfano tells the viewer about tips for young children about shore excursions. It also airs regular Royal Caribbean commercials around the ship.

Royal Caribbean International